Guy Amouretti (1925-2011), was a male French international table tennis player.

He won a bronze medal at the 1947 World Table Tennis Championships in the men's team event and the following year won a silver medal and another bronze at the 1948 World Table Tennis Championships in the men's team event and men's singles respectively.

In 1952 he won a bronze at the 1952 World Table Tennis Championships in the men's singles and the following year collected his fifth world championship medal after winning a bronze at the 1953 World Table Tennis Championships in the men's team event.

He was seven times champion of France in the singles, in 1944, 1948, 1953, 1954, 1955, 1957 and 1959. He died in 2011.

See also
 List of table tennis players
 List of World Table Tennis Championships medalists

References

French male table tennis players
1925 births
2011 deaths
World Table Tennis Championships medalists
20th-century French people